DeGroff is a surname. Notable people with the surname include:

Alzina Orndorff DeGroff, American businesswoman and civic activist
Dale DeGroff (born 1948), American bartender and author
Edward DeGroff (1860–1910), American merchant and photographer
John DeGroff, American Christian musician
John W. DeGroff (1843–1895), American politician
Rube DeGroff (1879–1955), American baseball player